Lewisville is a city in Lafayette County, Arkansas, United States. The population was 1,280 at the 2010 census. It is the county seat of Lafayette County.

Geography
Lewisville is located in northern Lafayette County at  (33.360636, -93.579317). U.S. Route 82 passes through the south side of the city, leading east  to Magnolia and west  to Texarkana. Arkansas Highway 29 passes through the center of Lewisville, leading north  to Hope and south  to Bradley.

Climate

According to the Köppen Climate Classification system, Lewisville has a humid subtropical climate, abbreviated "Cfa" on climate maps.

Demographics

2020 census

As of the 2020 United States census, there were 915 people, 360 households, and 225 families residing in the city.

2000 census
As of the census of 2000, there were 1,285 people, 518 households, and 349 families residing in the town. The racial makeup of the city was 49.34% White, 49.34% Black or African American, 0.16% Native American, 0.70% from other races, and 0.47% from two or more races.  2.10% of the population were Hispanic or Latino of any race.

There were 518 households, out of which 28.8% had children under the age of 18 living with them, 46.7% were married couples living together, 16.2% had a female householder with no husband present, and 32.6% were non-families. 30.1% of all households were made up of individuals, and 15.3% had someone living alone who was 65 years of age or older.  The average household size was 2.47 and the average family size was 3.04.

In the city, the population was spread out, with 25.8% under the age of 18, 7.9% from 18 to 24, 25.7% from 25 to 44, 22.3% from 45 to 64, and 18.3% who were 65 years of age or older.  The median age was 39 years. For every 100 females, there were 86.5 males.  For every 100 females age 18 and over, there were 80.5 males.

The median income for a household in the town was $26,719, and the median income for a family was $34,712. Males had a median income of $24,408 versus $16,850 for females. The per capita income for the city was $13,733.  About 17.2% of families and 21.3% of the population were below the poverty line, including 27.3% of those under age 18 and 16.1% of those age 65 or over.

Education
Public education for elementary and secondary students is provided by the Lafayette County School District. On July 1, 2003, the Lewisville district consolidated with the Stamps School District to form the Lafayette County School District.

Infrastructure

Highways
  U.S. Highway 82
  Arkansas Highway 29
  Arkansas Highway 313

Gallery

Notable people
 W. W. Carloss, member of the Louisiana House of Representatives, 1874-1878; fought in Siege of Port Hudson, 1863; lived in Lafayette County after 1878
 Lewis B. Fort, one of the first settlers in Lafayette County and the individual whose given name was used in naming the town of Lewisville
 Charles McClendon, former LSU football coach

References

Cities in Arkansas
Cities in Lafayette County, Arkansas
County seats in Arkansas